Exoteleia nepheos, the pine candle moth, is a moth of the family Gelechiidae. It is found in North America, where it has been recorded from southern Ontario and northern Ohio.

The wingspan is 9–11 mm. The forewings are golden brown with three greyish and white granular transverse fasciae. The extreme base is greyish, granular, extending narrowly along the costal and anal areas. The first fascia is found at the basal third, margined inwardly with scattered white scales intermixed with black scales below the fold. The second fascia is similarly marked but also contains a black spot outwardly below the fold and the third fascia is white and found at the apical four-fifths. The hindwings are blackish. Adults are on wing from early July to early August in one generation per year.

The larvae feed on Pinus resinosa, Pinus sylvestris and Pinus mugo. They mine along the edges of the apical portion of the needles of their host plant. The species overwinters within the needle mine as a fourth instar larva. Pupation occurs in the flowers and shoots of the host.

References

Moths described in 1967
Exoteleia